Persimmon Gap is a mountain pass located in Big Bend National Park in Texas.

It is traversed by U.S. Highway 385.

Climate
Coordinates: 
Elevation:

References

External links
 

Mountain passes of Texas
Landforms of Brewster County, Texas
Big Bend National Park